Geoff Snider (born 2 April 1981) is a retired Canadian lacrosse player from Calgary, Alberta.

Amateur career
Growing up, Snider played for the Calgary Hornets in the Calgary District Lacrosse Association. His junior lacrosse career began with the Burnaby Lakers of the British Columbia Junior A Lacrosse League. In 1998, 2000 and 2002, he helped the Lakers win the Minto Cup as Canada's champion junior men's lacrosse team. He continued to play with the Senior "A" Coquitlam Adanacs in the Western Lacrosse Association, leading them to win the 2007 WLA championship.

Snider honed his physical game in the summer box lacrosse seasons and in junior hockey.  With the junior ice hockey Calgary Canucks, of the Alberta Junior Hockey League, Snider racked up 415 penalty minutes during the 2001–02 season. In lacrosse he has developed a reputation as being one of lacrosse's top fighters.

Collegiate career
Snider attended the University of Denver.  In 2006, with the Pioneers he was named a third-team All-American.  His 194 recorded groundballs as a senior holds the record for a single season groundballs in NCAA lacrosse.  In addition he holds the standard for highest average groundballs per game in a season with 11.41.

Professional career

NLL career
Snider was drafted by the Philadelphia Wings of the National Lacrosse League in the first round (fourth overall) of the 2006 NLL Entry Draft.  
Snider made an immediate impact on the league and was named the NLL's January Rookie of the Month. Snider scored 13 points (6G, 7A), collected 53 loose balls and won 53 of 79 face-off attempts in five games during his first month of action in the league. He was also the only rookie voted onto the 2007 All-Star team, and won the Accuracy challenge in the All-Star game Skills Competition. After the season, Snider was named to the 2007 All-Rookie team.

On 26 January 2008, Snider put his name in the record books again when he won the opening face-off in a game against the Buffalo Bandits and scored :05 seconds into the game.  This goal is the league record for fastest goal to start a game.

In the 2008 season, Snider was named to the All-Star team, and was named game MVP after scoring three goals, recording 28 loose balls, and winning 31 out of 38 face-offs. He set league records in loose balls (244), faceoffs won (318), and penalty minutes (103), and fell just short of tying his own faceoff winning percentage record of 75%, winning 73.8% of his faceoffs.

During the 2009 NLL season, he was named a starter to the All-Star Game but was unable to play due to injury when he suffered a tracheal fracture (windpipe) in a game against the Edmonton Rush. Snider was also named to the 2012 All-Star game and scored 4 goals, added 2 assists, and won 22 of 26 faceoffs. Snider was named game MVP.

MLL
Snider was drafted by the Denver Outlaws of Major League Lacrosse in the second round of the MLL Collegiate Draft. During the 2007 MLL season, Snider played in the MLL All-Star Game representing the Western Conference. Snider has participated in two MLL championships. In 2008 with the Denver Outlaws, and in 2009 with the champion Toronto Nationals.

In 2012 he was traded to the Charlotte Hounds where he helped lead the team to its first playoff and championship appearance.

In December 2014 he was traded by the Charlotte Hounds to the Denver Outlaws for midfielder Terry Kimener.

MSL
On 30 June 2009 the Peterborough Lakers of Major Series Lacrosse announced they signed Snider. He played his first game as a Laker on 1 July and made his Peterborough debut on 2 July.

International career
In international competition, Snider won the tournament MVP award at the 2006 World Lacrosse Championship, where he dominated face-offs helping the Canadian National Men's Lacrosse team win their first World Championship win since 1978.

Statistics

NLL
Reference:

MLL

NCAA

References

1981 births
Canadian lacrosse players
Denver Pioneers men's lacrosse
Living people
Major League Lacrosse players
National Lacrosse League All-Stars
Philadelphia Wings players
Sportspeople from Calgary
Hamilton Nationals players